Rear Admiral Hubert Lynes,  (27 November 1874 – 10 November 1942) was a British admiral whose First World War service was notable for his direction of the Zeebrugge and Ostend raids designed to neutralise the German-held port of Bruges, which was used as a raiding base against the British coastline by Imperial German Navy surface and submarine raiders. Throughout his service life and during retirement, Lynes was a noted and experienced ornithologist who contributed to numerous books on the subject and was in his lifetime considered the leading expert on African birds.

Naval career
Born in 1874, Hubert Lynes was given to a career at sea from a young age. He was educated at Stubbington House School, an establishment with strong connections to the navy, and enlisted in the Royal Navy aged 13 in 1888. He rose through the ranks and was a lieutenant when in July 1902 he was appointed in command of the gunboat . In 1905 he was promoted to captain and placed in command of the small   in the Mediterranean. He commanded her until 1908, when he returned to England for a period ashore before taking command of the screw sloop  on the China Station in 1910. Remaining on Cadmus until 1912, he was again returned to a shore station, where he remained until the outbreak of the First World War.

An experienced naval officer, Lynes was given command of the brand-new  cruiser , which completed construction in early 1915 and served in the Atlantic for the next year. This freed Lynes for a new post, that of second in command to Admiral Roger Keyes, a dynamic officer who was in charge of the "Allied Naval and Marine Forces" a department of the Admiralty which planned and conducted raids and commando-style operations on German-held territory.

Zeebrugge and Ostend
The culmination of Keyes and Lynes' work in this office was the Zeebrugge Raid of April 1918 and the subsidiary raids at Ostend in April and May. The plan in these operations was to sink obsolete nineteenth century cruisers in the canals linking Zeebrugge and Ostend with the vital naval base at Bruges, thus bottling up the German force in the base and preventing its use by the U-boat fleet during their war on Allied commerce (Handelskrieg). The operations suffered heavy casualties amongst the attacking sailors and marines but did succeed in sinking the blockships and partially obstructing the canal, although the full effect of these attacks had been subject to debate ever since.

At the war's end, Lynes was present at the surrender of the German High Seas Fleet at Scapa Flow as Captain of the new and powerful battleship . His war decorations included investiture as a Companion of the Order of the Bath and as a Companion of the Order of St Michael and St George as well as being made a Commander of the Legion d'honneur and the Order of Leopold (Belgium) and awarded the Croix de Guerre. In 1919, Lynes accepted retirement and left the sea, settling in the countryside with the rank of rear admiral.

Ornithology
A highly experienced ornithologist, Lynes developed a boyhood interest in nature into a scientific study of birdlife during his time in the navy. Whilst in the Mediterranean during the first years of the twentieth century, Lynes made extensive notes on migratory patterns of European and African birds and made the first of twelve expeditions he would make to Africa to study its native birdlife. These observations were published in ornithological magazines The Ibis and British Birds and he was elected a member of the British Ornithologists' Union. He would continue to contribute to these journals throughout his life.

In 1910 whilst on home duty, Lynes participated in an expedition to the Pyrenees and whilst stationed in China made numerous observations of the birds of the region. These notes and collections were however all lost in the torpedoing of the Penelope in 1916. Upon retirement, Lynes travelled to the Darfur region of the Sudan, and made extensive observations of Bird life there, compiling a study which was published in 1930 in The Ibis as Review of the genus Cisticola. This work was well received and Lynes was awarded the Godman-Salvin Medal for his contributions to the study of African ornithology. In the same year he served as vice-president of the British Ornithiologists' Union and was made a correspondence member of the American Ornithologists' Union. He had also been made a fellow of the Royal Geographical Society and the Zoological Society of London.

In 1936 he made a further study of birds in Egypt, but two years later he contracted shingles in Sudan and was forced to return home with his health ruined. He never again travelled and entered a long convalescence from which he never fully recovered. At the outbreak of World War II in 1939, Lynes was posted as senior naval officer in North Wales, a light administrative post given his ill health, and one which he was nevertheless unable to sustain, retiring again in 1941. He continued writing on birds of the Sudan right up until his death, in November 1942 aged 67 at a naval hospital. He was buried under a Commonwealth War Graves Commission headstone in St. Seiriol Churchyard, Holyhead. His health had never recovered from his illness in Africa. He never married and lived his entire life with his maiden sister, who cared for him when not at sea.

References

1874 births
1942 deaths
Royal Navy admirals of World War II
British ornithologists
Fellows of the Royal Geographical Society
Fellows of the Zoological Society of London
Royal Navy officers of World War I
People educated at Stubbington House School

Companions of the Order of the Bath
Companions of the Order of St Michael and St George